The 1965 Gael Linn Cup, the most important representative competition for elite level participants in the women's team field sport of camogie, was won by Leinster, who defeated Ulster in the final, played at Casmeent Park Belfast.

Arrangements
Connacht offered little by way of resistance to a superior Ulster outfit at Castlebar and paid the heavy price of a 7–13 to 1–0 defeat. In the second semi-final, Leinster defeated Munster by 4–9 to 2–1 at Fermoy. Leinster led Ulster by 3–3 to 1–0 at half time in the final at Casement Park, Ulster's two late goals left the final score at Leinster 4–3, Ulster 4–1.
 Agnes Hourigan wrote in the Irish Press: Antrim's Sue Ward, who was switched to attack from defence, gave new life to the Ulster side when she scored two goals and a point and had a third shot deflected to the net by a Leinster defender. The Ulster rally came too late as their last two goals came in the closing minutes and over the hour Leinster were deserving winners.

Final stages

|}

References

External links
 Camogie Association

1965 in camogie
1965
1964 in Northern Ireland sport